Ramiro Figueiras Amarelle (born December 17, 1977) is a Spanish former beach soccer player and currently the head coach of China national beach soccer team. He was the captain of the Spain national beach soccer team. Before he began to play beach soccer he played for Deportivo de La Coruña B. In 2019, the magazine France Football placed Amarelle third in an article named "10 Legends of Beach Soccer".

Honours

Football
 Deportivo de La Coruña
 Copa de Campeones Juvenil de Fútbol: 1995-1996

Beach Soccer

Club
Milano Beach Soccer
Scudetto: 2006, 2007
Coppa Italia: 2006, 2007, 2009
FC Barcelona
Mundialito de Clubes: 2015

Country
 Spain
FIFA Beach Soccer World Cup runner-up: 2003, 2004
FIFA Beach Soccer World Cup third place: 2000
Euro Beach Soccer League winner: 1999, 2000, 2001, 2003, 2006
Euro Beach Soccer League runner-up: 2002
Euro Beach Soccer League third place: 1998
Euro Beach Soccer Cup winner: 2008, 2009
Euro Beach Soccer Cup runner-up: 2004
Euro Beach Soccer League Spanish Event (Mallorca) winner: 2004
Euro Beach Soccer League Norwegian Event (Stavanger) winner: 2004
Euro Beach Soccer League Italian Event (Scoglitti) winner: 2004
Euro Beach Soccer League Group A event, Mallorca (Spain) winner: 2006
Euro Beach Soccer League Portuguese Event (Portimão) runner-up: 2004
Euro Beach Soccer League Group A event, Tignes (France) runner-up: 2006
Copa Latina runner-up: 2000, 2004
Mundialito runner-up: 2004
Mundialito third place: 2001, 2009
BSWW Tour runner-up: 2001
World League third place: 2001

Individual
FIFA Beach Soccer World Cup MVP: 2003, 2008
FIFA Beach Soccer World Cup Silver Shoe: 2008
Euro Beach Soccer League MVP: 1998, 2000, 2001, 2003
Euro Beach Soccer League Top Scorer: 1998, 2007
Euro Beach Soccer League Rookie Of The Year: 1998
Euro Beach Soccer League Norwegian Event (Stavanger) Best Player: 2004
Euro Beach Soccer League Italian Event (Scoglitti) Best Player: 2004
Euro Beach Soccer League Portuguese Event (Portimão) Top Scorer: 2004
Euro Beach Soccer League Italian Stage (San Benedetto del Tronto) Top Scorer: 2007
Mundialito MVP: 2001
Mundialito Top Scorer: 2009
BSWW Tour MVP: 2001
World League Top Scorer: 2001
Capocannoniere Serie A: 2006
Capocannoniere Coppa Italia: 2007
Member of the Euro All-Star squad selected to play against Brazil in Tarragona 2007 (Spain)

References

1977 births
Living people
Spanish footballers
Deportivo Fabril players
Spanish beach soccer players
Association football forwards